Houghton Hall may refer to:

 Houghton Hall, stately home in Norfolk, England (Walpole seat)
 Houghton Hall, East Riding of Yorkshire, country house in the East Riding of Yorkshire, England

See also 
 Houghton House, ruined mansion in Bedfordshire, England
 Hoghton Tower, fortified manor house in Lancashire, England